Arne Halse (20 October 1887 – 3 July 1975) was a Norwegian athlete who specialized in the different forms of javelin throw. He represented Trondhjems IF and later SK Brage, both in Trondheim.

At the 1906 Summer Olympics he finished seventh in the freestyle javelin throw. At the 1908 Summer Olympics he won a silver medal in the regular javelin throw, a bronze medal in freestyle and finished fifth in shot put. At the 1912 Summer Olympics he finished seventh in the regular javelin throw and fifth in the two-handed javelin throw.

He became Norwegian champion in javelin throw in 1905–1907 and 1909 and in shot put in 1906–1907 and 1909.

References

External links 
 
 

1887 births
1975 deaths
Norwegian male javelin throwers
Norwegian male shot putters
Olympic athletes of Norway
Olympic silver medalists for Norway
Olympic bronze medalists for Norway
Athletes (track and field) at the 1906 Intercalated Games
Athletes (track and field) at the 1908 Summer Olympics
Athletes (track and field) at the 1912 Summer Olympics
Medalists at the 1908 Summer Olympics
Olympic silver medalists in athletics (track and field)
Olympic bronze medalists in athletics (track and field)